James Ray Hart may refer to:

Jim Ray Hart (1941–2016), American baseball player 
Jimmy Hart (born 1943), American professional wrestling manager and musician